Harvard-Westlake School is an independent, co-educational university preparatory day school consisting of two campuses located in Los Angeles, California, with approximately 1,600 students enrolled in grades seven through twelve. Its two predecessor organizations began as for-profit schools before turning non-profit, and eventually merging. It is not affiliated with Harvard University despite being named after it.

The school has two campuses, the middle school campus in Holmby Hills and the high school, or what Harvard-Westlake refers to as their Upper School, in Studio City. It is a member of the G30 Schools group.

History

Harvard School for Boys 
The Harvard School for Boys was established in 1900 by Grenville C. Emery as a military academy, on the site of a barley field located at the corner of Western Avenue and Sixteenth Street (now Venice Boulevard) in Los Angeles, California. Emery was originally from Boston, and around 1900 he wrote to Harvard University to ask permission to use the Harvard name for his new secondary school, and received permission from the university's then-President, Charles W. Eliot. In 1911, it secured endorsement from the Episcopal Church, becoming a non-profit organization. In 1937, the school moved to its present-day campus at the former Hollywood Country Club on Coldwater Canyon in Studio City after receiving a $25,000 ($ in current dollar terms) loan from aviation pioneer Donald Douglas. In the late 1960s and early 1970s, the Harvard School gradually discontinued both boarding and its standing as a military academy, while expanding its enrollment, courses, classes, teachers, and curriculum.

Westlake School for Girls 
The Westlake School for Girls was established in 1904 by Jessica Smith Vance and Frederica de Laguna in what is now downtown Los Angeles, California, as an exclusively female institution offering both elementary and secondary education. It was so-named because it was near Westlake Park, now known as MacArthur Park. At the time, the school was a for-profit alternative to the already-established Marlborough School, which had been established as a non-profit before the turn of the century.

It moved to its present-day campus located on North Faring Road in Holmby Hills, California, in 1927. The school was purchased by Sydney Temple, whose daughter, Helen Temple Dickinson, was headmistress until 1966, when Westlake became a non-profit institution.  The Temple family owned the school until 1977, with Dickinson serving in an ex officio capacity.  In 1968 Westlake became exclusively a secondary school.

Merger 
As both schools continued to grow in size towards the late 1980s, and as gender exclusivity became less of a factor both in the schools' reputations and desirability, the trustees of both Harvard and Westlake effectuated a merger in 1989. The two institutions had long been de facto sister schools, and interacted socially. Complete integration and coeducation began in 1991.

Cheating scandal 
In 2008, six sophomores were expelled and more than a dozen other students faced suspensions as a result of a cheating scandal.

Campuses 
Currently, the school is split between the two campuses, with grades 7–9, the Middle School, located at the former Westlake campus in Holmby Hills and grades 10–12, the Upper School, located at the former Harvard campus in Studio City.

The Middle School campus completed a four-year modernization in September 2008, replacing the original administration building, the library, and the instrumental music building.  The campus now features a new library, two levels of classrooms in the Academic Center, the new Seaver Science Center, a turf field, a new administration office, a putting green, a long jump pit, and a large parking lot.  Another significant addition of the project was the Bing Performing Arts Center which features a two-level, 800-seat theater, a suite of practice rooms, a few large classrooms for band, orchestra, and choir classes, a black box theater, a dance studio, and a room with atomic pianos for composing electronic music.

Remnants of the former Middle School campus include the Marshall Center, which houses a gymnasium, weight room, and wrestling room, a  swimming pool and diving boards, an outdoor basketball court, and a tennis court.  Reynolds Hall, an academic building which is home to history, foreign language, and visual arts classes, began a modernization effort in June 2014 to be completed by September 2015.  The building was named Wang Hall in honor of two parents who donated approximately $5 million to fund the project.

The Upper School campus features the Munger Science Center and computer lab; the Rugby building which houses the English department, 300-seat theater, costume shop, and drama lab; the Seaver building, home to the foreign language and history departments as well as administrative offices and the visitor lobby; Chalmers, which houses the performing arts and math departments, book store, cafeteria, sandwich window, and student lounge; Kutler, which houses the Brendan Kutler Center for Interdisciplinary Studies and Independent Research  and the Feldman-Horn visual arts studios, dark room, video labs, and gallery.

The athletic facilities include Taper Gymnasium, used for volleyball and basketball as well as final exams; Hamilton Gymnasium, the older gymnasium still used for team practices and final exams; Copses Family Pool, a 50-meter Olympic size facility with a team room and stadium for viewing events for the aquatics program; and Ted Slavin Field, which features an artificial FieldTurf surface and a synthetic track and is used for football, soccer, track & field, lacrosse, and field hockey. In 2007, lights were added to Ted Slavin Field.  The school also maintains an off-campus baseball facility, the O'Malley Family Field, in Encino, California.

The Upper School campus also features the three-story Seeley G. Mudd Library, which is undergoing a large renovation over the Summer of 2023, and Saint Saviour's Chapel, a vestige from Harvard School for Boys' Episcopal days.

In 2017, Harvard Westlake paid more than $40M for Weddington Golf & Tennis, a 16-acre country club located less than a mile from the Upper School campus, with plans to build a Community Athletics Center on the location. Their draft construction plan is still under review by the Los Angeles City Council.

Tuition 
For the 2020–2021 school year is $41,300, with a new student fee of $2,000. Other expenses—which include books, transportation, meals, and class activities—typically average $2,500 to $5,000 (the latter for those who take advantage of the school's comprehensive bus service).

Harvard-Westlake provided $11 million in financial aid in 2018. That year, approximately 20% of the student body received financial aid, which averaged $27,000 for each student that received financial aid.

Academic achievement 
For the HW Class of 2019, average SATs were 716 (verbal) and 745 (math). Among the 292 seniors, there were 27 National Merit Semifinalists. Out of the approximately 1400 graduates between 2014 and 2018, twenty or more matriculated at the following universities: Barnard (20), Brown (33), Colgate (20), Columbia (37), Cornell (36), Duke (20), Emory (24), Georgetown (21), Harvard (45), Johns Hopkins (23), Kenyon (22), New York University (83), Northwestern (31), Stanford (38), Tulane (25), U. Cal Berkeley (42), U. of Chicago (43), U. of Michigan (70), U. of Pennsylvania (42), U. of Southern Cal (92), Wash U. St. Louis (50), Yale (22). 

For the 2019–2020 school year, Niche ranked Harvard-Westlake the best private high school in Los Angeles, the 2nd best private high school in California, and the 6th best private school in the United States.

Athletics 
Harvard-Westlake fields 22 varsity teams in the California Interscholastic Federation Southern Section, as well as teams on the junior varsity, club, and junior high levels. 60% of HW students participate in interscholastic sports.

Harvard-Westlake maintains a strong e-sports presence with a two year streak from 2018–2020 as 2nd strongest League of Legends team in California.

Notable alumni 

 Jonathan Ahdout, actor
 Elisa Albert, author
 Dorothy Arzner, film director
 Jillian Banks, musician
 Candice Bergen, actress
 Peter Bergman, actor
 Steve Bing, film producer, philanthropist
 Sir Ian Blair, Commissioner of Police of the Metropolis, London
  Brennan Boesch, MLB player 
 Autumn Burke, California State Assemblymember
 Jessica Capshaw, actress
 Mindy Cohn, actress
 Jarron Collins, NBA player
 Jason Collins, NBA player
 Lily Collins, actress, model, host
 Jamie Lee Curtis, actress
 Gray Davis, Governor of California
 Emily Deschanel, actress and model
 Ned Doheny, musician
 Dominique Dunne, actress
 Breck Eisner, TV and film director
 Tony Fagenson, songwriter, drummer for the rock band Eve 6
 Douglas Fairbanks Jr., actor
 Beanie Feldstein, actress
 Ayda Field, actress
 Stephen Fishbach, contestant on Survivor: Tocantins and Survivor: Cambodia
 Jack Flaherty, MLB player for the St. Louis Cardinals
 Bridget Fonda, actress
 Max Fried, MLB player for the Atlanta Braves
 Eric Garcetti, Los Angeles Mayor (2013 - 2022)
 Scott Garson, basketball coach, College of Idaho
 Jean Paul Getty, businessman 
 Lucas Giolito, MLB player for the Chicago White Sox
 Russell Goldsmith, attorney, Chairman and CEO of the City National Bank
 Ashley Grossman (born 1993), water polo player
 Jake Gyllenhaal, actor
 Maggie Gyllenhaal, actress
 Julia Hahn, Breitbart News reporter, special assistant to President Trump
 H. R. Haldeman, White House Chief of Staff (1969–73)
 Mark Harmon, actor, NCIS
 Evan Harris, British Member of Parliament
 Frank C. Hoyt, theoretical physicist
 Peter Hudnut, Olympian; three time U.S. Men's Water Polo
 Alex Israel, multimedia artist, writer, and eyewear designer
 Jon Jaques, professional basketball player, assistant basketball coach (Cornell University)
 Johnny Juzang, NBA player for the Utah Jazz
 Chad Kanoff, NFL player
 Juliette Kayyem, author, TV analyst
 Fran Kranz, actor
 David Ladd, producer and actor
 Phil LaMarr, actor, voice actor, stand up comedian
 Pepi Lederer, actress and writer
 June Lockhart, actress
 Billie Lourd, actress and daughter of Carrie Fisher
 Jon Lovitz, actor
 Myrna Loy, actress
 Danica McKellar, actress, author
 Alex Marlow, Breitbart News editor-in-chief
 Jonathan Martin, retired NFL player
 Elizabeth Montgomery, actress
 Sara Moonves, magazine editor
 Tracy Nelson, actress
 Masi Oka, actor 
 Ethan Peck, actor, grandson of actor Gregory Peck
 Elvis Perkins, singer, son of actor Anthony Perkins
 Ben Platt, Broadway and film actor
 Spencer Rascoff, Co-founder of Zillow, Hotwire, Pacaso, Recon Food; former CEO of Zillow
 Jeff Rake, television producer, screenwriter
 Jason Reitman, Golden Globe-winning screenwriter, director
 Sally Ride, astronaut
 Ali Riley, soccer player 
 Josh Satin, retired major league baseball player 
 Andrea Savage, actress
 David Sauvage, filmmaker, empath 
 Jason Segel, actor, screenwriter
 Ben Sherwood, president of ABC News
 Brad Silberling, film director
 Jacob Soboroff, journalist and correspondent, NBC News and MSNBC
 Tori Spelling, actress
 Alex Stepheson, professional basketball player
 Erik Swoope, NFL player
 David Talbot, journalist, author, media entrepreneur
 Stephen Talbot, child actor; documentary filmmaker, PBS Frontline
 Shirley Temple, actress, diplomat
 Dara Torres, swimmer and Olympic medalist
 Nik Turley, baseball player
 Dorothy Wang, socialite; actress, Rich Kids of Beverly Hills
 Matthew Weiner, writer, creator of Mad Men
 Eric Weinstein, Podcast host and a former Managing Director at Thiel Capital.
 Douglas Wick, movie producer
 Austin Wilson, baseball player
 Jessica Yellin, journalist
 Dean Zanuck, motion picture executive and producer

Notable faculty
 Amy Alcott (born 1956) – Hall of Fame professional golfer
 Caitlin Flanagan (born 1961) – writer and social critic
 Ethan Katz (born 1983) – pitching coach for the Chicago White Sox
 Ashton Kutcher (born 1978) – actor

References

Further reading

External links 

 

High schools in Los Angeles
High schools in the San Fernando Valley
Private high schools in Los Angeles County, California
Private middle schools in Los Angeles County, California
Preparatory schools in California
Educational institutions established in 1900
1900 establishments in California
Defunct United States military academies
Beverly Crest, Los Angeles
Holmby Hills, Los Angeles
Studio City, Los Angeles